Billy P. Kametz  (March 22, 1987 – June 9, 2022) was an American voice and stage actor. He was best known for his work dubbing anime and video games.

Born in Lancaster, Pennsylvania, Kametz began his voice acting career in 2016 when he moved to Los Angeles and debuted as Aladdin in a Broadway-styled musical for the Disneyland Resort. He had been providing the English voices for Josuke Higashikata in JoJo's Bizarre Adventure: Diamond is Unbreakable, Takuto Maruki in Persona 5 Royal, Naofumi Iwatani in The Rising of the Shield Hero, and Ferdinand von Aegir in Fire Emblem: Three Houses. Kametz's work was praised by his peers and he had won the Best Voice Actor Award at the 4th Crunchyroll Anime Awards for his role as Naofumi. 

He was diagnosed with stage IV colon cancer in February 2022, which he publicly announced ten weeks later on April 26, 2022, and died less than 2 months after announcing his diagnosis at the age of 35 on June 9, 2022.

Early life
Kametz was born on March 22, 1987, in Lancaster, Pennsylvania, and was raised in Hershey, Pennsylvania. He had a sister. He attended West Chester University.

Career

In 2016, Kametz moved to Sherman Oaks in Los Angeles to play Aladdin in the final performance of Disney's Aladdin: A Musical Spectacular. While living in California, Kametz began working as a voice actor. He achieved one of his first major roles when he was cast as Josuke Higashikata in the Viz Media dub of JoJo's Bizarre Adventure: Diamond is Unbreakable. He went on to voice other prominent roles, including Colt in Brawl Stars, Takuto Maruki in Persona 5 Royal, Galo Thymos in Promare, and Ren in Pokémon. 

In 2020, for his performance as Naofumi Iwatani in The Rising of the Shield Hero, Kametz won the Best VA Performance (EN) award at the 4th Crunchyroll Anime Awards. Apart from animations, he also provided his voice for many characters in various related video games.

Personal life

Kametz dated voice actress Erica Lindbeck up until his death in 2022.

Illness and death
On April 26, 2022, Kametz revealed that he had been diagnosed with stage IV colon cancer ten weeks prior, which had metastasized to his liver, lungs and spine, and that he had begun chemotherapy and radiation therapy. He also announced that he would be taking a hiatus from voice acting and moving back to Hershey, Pennsylvania. A GoFundMe page was posted on May 1, 2022, to help cover travel, insurance costs, medical bills not covered by insurance, and everyday life necessities; these online fundraising efforts yielded more than US$184,000.

Within several weeks after announcing his cancer diagnosis, Kametz succumbed to it at the age of 35 in Hershey, Pennsylvania, on June 9, 2022. Following his untimely death, his ongoing roles were recast with other voice actors.

Filmography

Animation

Anime

Video games

References

External links 
 
 
 
 

1987 births
2022 deaths
American male video game actors
American male voice actors
Crunchyroll Anime Awards winners
Deaths from cancer in Pennsylvania
Deaths from colorectal cancer
Male actors from Pennsylvania
People from Hershey, Pennsylvania
People from Lancaster, Pennsylvania
21st-century American male actors